Bong, Venlo may refer to:
 Bong, Velden, a village in Venlo, the Netherlands
 Bong, Maasbree, a village in Venlo, the Netherlands

See also
Bong (disambiguation)